Bigelow is a surname. Notable people with the surname include:

 Abijah Bigelow (1775–1860), US Representative from Massachusetts
 Albert Bigelow (1906–1993), former US Navy officer turned peace activist and Quaker
 Bob Bigelow (born 1953), retired National Basketball Association player
 Charles A. Bigelow (1862-1912), American actor
 Charles Bigelow (type designer) (born 1945)
 Daniel Bigelow (1824–1905), American lawyer and politician
 Doug Bigelow (1928–1996), Australian rules footballer with Essendon Football Club
 Edward Manning Bigelow (1850–1916), Pittsburgh City Engineer, Director of Public Works and "father of Pittsburgh's parks"
 Ella A. Bigelow (1849–1917), American author and clubwoman
 Elliot Bigelow (1897–1933), Major League Baseball player
 Elmer Charles Bigelow (1920–1945), US Medal of Honor posthumous recipient
 Erastus Brigham Bigelow (1814–1879), American inventor of weaving machines
 Frank Hagar Bigelow (1851–1924), United States astronomer and meteorologist
 Frederick Ellsworth Bigelow (1873–1929), American bandmaster and composer
 Harry Bigelow (1874–1950), American lawyer and big-game hunter
 Henry Bryant Bigelow (1879–1967), American oceanographer and marine biologist
 Henry Jacob Bigelow (1818–1890), American surgeon and Harvard University professor
 Herbert S. Bigelow (1870–1951), US Representative from Ohio
 Hobart B. Bigelow (1834–1891), American politician and 50th Governor of Connecticut
 Horace Bigelow (1898–1980), American chess master and organizer
 Howard E. Bigelow (1923–1987), American mycologist
 Iva Bigelow (later Iva Bigelow Weaver; 1875–1932), American singer
 Jacob Bigelow (1787–1879), American physician, botanist, architect and professor
 John Bigelow (1817–1911), American lawyer
 John Bigelow Jr. (1854–1936), US Army officer and son of John Bigelow
 John Milton Bigelow (1804–1878), American physician and botanist
 John P. Bigelow (1797–1872), mayor of Boston, Secretary of State of Massachusetts and member of the Massachusetts House of Representatives
 Julian Bigelow (1913–2003), American pioneering computer engineer
 Kathryn Bigelow (born 1951), American film director
 Lettie S. Bigelow (1848/49 – 1906), American author
 Lewis Bigelow (1785–1838), US Representative from Massachusetts
 Lisa Jenn Bigelow, American writer of children's books and young adult novels
 Lucius A. Bigelow (1892–1973), American chemistry professor
 Poultney Bigelow (1855–1954), American journalist and author
 Robert Bigelow (born 1945), hotel magnate

 Rolla Bigelow (1878–1952), American banker
 Scott Bam Bam Bigelow (1961–2007), American professional wrestler
 Stephen Bigelow, Australian mathematician and professor of mathematics at the University of California, Santa Barbara
 Timothy Bigelow (soldier) (1739–1790), Continental Army colonel in the American Revolutionary War
 Timothy Bigelow (lawyer) (1767–1821), Speaker of the Massachusetts House of Representatives
 Tom Bigelow (born 1939), former racing driver
 Wilfred Gordon Bigelow (1913–2005), Canadian surgeon known for his role in developing the artificial pacemaker
 William Sturgis Bigelow (1850–1926), American physician and collector of Japanese art